P72 may refer to:

 De Tomaso P72, an Italian sports car
 , a submarine of the Royal Navy
 Papyrus 72, an early New Testament papyrus
 ThinkPad P72, a laptop
 Republic XP-72, an American fighter aircraft
 P72, a state regional road in Latvia